Guy Chandler Fulton (October 27, 1892 – October 15, 1974) was an American architect known for his work on numerous buildings at the University of Florida while he was State Architect of Florida.

Early life
Fulton was born in Warsaw, Illinois to Perry A Fulton and Luella ‘Lulu’ Chandler,  
but attended Keokuk High School in Iowa. After graduation, he was accepted at the University of Illinois, where he studied architecture. He graduated in 1916 with a Bachelor of Science in Architecture, then served in the U.S. Army in World War I from 1917 to 1919. After the war, Fulton gained experience working for various firms in the midwest.

Fulton married the former Shirley Holmes about 1922, but the couple had no children. He read about the Florida land boom of the 1920s and recognized an opportunity. The couple moved to Florida and he secured a job in the Florida State Architect's office as a draftsman in 1926. Around that time, he was commissioned to design the springhouse and spring-fed pool at Glen Springs in Gainesville. While he was proving himself at his state job, he also took  numerous freelance jobs, primarily designing private residences. He was eventually named Assistant to the Architect, and received his architect's license in 1932. Fulton became a member of the American Institute of Architects in 1940. 
That same year, he redesigned the facility at Glen Springs, resulting in three pools with a "brilliant drainage system".

Success
After World War II, college enrollment increased, resulting in a building boom on the Florida campus. Beginning in 1945, Fulton served as Architect to the Florida Board of Control, designing and supervising construction of University of Florida buildings, as well as those at Florida State University and Florida A&M University. 
His design theme at UF was that of a unified body of work, and his buildings used many of the same elements as his predecessors, Rudolph Weaver and William Augustus Edwards. He also established guidelines for materials and building construction for visual campus unity. He retired from the position in 1956 to work for his own firm, Guy C. Fulton & Associates.
Following her death on November 29, 1990, funds from Shirley Fulton's estate were used to endow both the Guy C. Fulton Scholarship in Architecture and the Guy C. Fulton Scholarship in Engineering.

Buildings
Buildings on or near the UF campus designed by Fulton include:  

Alpha Chi Omega Sorority House
Alpha Delta Pi Sorority House
Alpha Epsilon Pi Fraternity House
Alpha Omicron Pi Sorority House
Beta Theta Pi Fraternity House
Broward Hall (named for Annie Isabell Broward)  
Bryan Hall-1949 North Addition
Carleton Auditorium
Catholic Student Center
Century Tower
Chi Omega Sorority House
Delta Delta Delta Sorority House
Delta Gamma Sorority House
East Hall
Florida Gymnasium 
Graham Hall 
The Hub
Hume Hall (the original)
J. Hillis Miller Health Science Center-1961 Pharmacy Wing 
Jennings Hall 
Kappa Delta Sorority House
Library East-1940 addition (now part of the George A. Smathers Libraries)
Mallory Hall
Matherly Hall

McCarty Hall A, B, C, D
North Hall
Phi Delta Theta Fraternity House (largest chapter in the U.S.)
Phi Mu Sorority House
Pi Lambda Phi Fraternity House 
Rawlings Hall
Reid Hall 
Riker Hall
Schucht Memorial Village
Simpson Hall
Sigma Kappa Sorority House
Tau Epsilon Phi Fraternity House 
Theta Chi Fraternity House
Tolbert Hall
Trusler Hall
UF Teaching Hospital (now part of Shands at the University of Florida) 
Van Fleet Hall 
Walker Hall 
Weaver Hall 
Weil Hall 
Williamson Hall
Yon Hall (Stadium)
Yulee Hall 
Zeta Beta Tau Fraternity House

References

External links
Guy Fulton info 
Building info

Guy Fulton buildings
People from Gainesville, Florida
1892 births
1974 deaths
20th-century American architects
Modernist architects
University of Illinois School of Architecture alumni
United States Army personnel of World War I
University of Florida people
People from Warsaw, Illinois